Margaret Leah Blundell (1907–1996) was a British artist, notable as a mural painter, commercial artist and printmaker.

Biography
Blundell was born at Wallasey, Cheshire (now Merseyside) and attended the Cheltenham Ladies' College before studying at the Cheltenham School of Art and then, from 1925, at the Liverpool School of Art. Subsequently, Blundell produced illustrations for magazines and catalogues and also created murals for shops and hotels. Her mural commissions included one for the cafeteria at Lewis' store in Manchester, for the Pleasure Beach Company at Blackpool, for the Daniel Neal chain of shops, for Heal's department store, for the liner RMS Caronia and for LMS hotels. Her murals were featured in the Architects' Journal and Building News. Illustrations by Blundell were featured in the Radio Times and in catalogues for WHSmith and for both Barkers' and Lewis' department stores. Throughout her painting career Blundell exhibited with the Royal Society of British Artists, the Society of Wood Engravers, the Royal Cambrian Academy and at the Walker Art Gallery in Liverpool.

Blundell lived at Rhydwyn on Anglesey in north Wales for several years and died at nearby Bangor.

References

1907 births
1996 deaths
20th-century English women artists
Alumni of Liverpool John Moores University
Artists from Merseyside
English illustrators
English women painters
People from Wallasey
People educated at Cheltenham Ladies' College
Women muralists